Sarah Marom-Shalev (born 23 September 1934) is an Israeli politician who served as a member of the Knesset for Gil between 2006 and 2009.

Biography
Born in Dorohoi in Romania, Marom-Shalev made aliyah to Israel in 1948, and today lives in Rehovot, and is divorced with two children.

For the 2006 Knesset elections she was placed seventh on the Gil list, and became a Knesset member when the party won seven seats. In June 2008 she was one of three MKs to leave Gil and form the Justice for the Elderly faction. On 27 October 2008 the faction merged back into Gil.

She lost her seat in the 2009 elections when the party failed to cross the electoral threshold.

References

External links

1934 births
Romanian Jews
Members of the 17th Knesset (2006–2009)
Women members of the Knesset
Living people
Justice for the Elderly politicians
Dor (political party) politicians
Romanian emigrants to Israel
21st-century Israeli women politicians